Nam Sang-ran (born 2 October 1966) is a South Korean rowing coxswain. She competed in the women's coxed four event at the 1988 Summer Olympics.

Nam attended Korea National Sport University. She won a silver medal in women's coxed four at the 1986 Asian Games with a time of 7:50.57.

References

1966 births
Living people
Korea National Sport University alumni
South Korean female rowers
Rowers at the 1986 Asian Games
Medalists at the 1986 Asian Games
Asian Games silver medalists for South Korea
Olympic rowers of South Korea
Rowers at the 1988 Summer Olympics
Place of birth missing (living people)
Asian Games medalists in rowing
Coxswains (rowing)